"Cruising" is a pop song by American–British singer Sinitta. The song was released in 1984 as the first single from Sinitta's debut album Sinitta! (1987). It was written by James George Hargreaves and produced by James George Hargreaves and Mick Parker. "Cruising" was re-recorded in 1999 and included on her compilation album The Very Best of...Sinitta. No music video was made for this song.

Formats and track listings
 7" Single
"Cruising" – 3:52
"Cruising" (Instrumental) – 3:35
 12" Single
"Cruising" (Extended Version) – 5:52
"Cruising" (Dub Mix) – 4:20

References

1984 songs
Sinitta songs
Songs written by George Hargreaves (politician)
1984 singles
Fanfare Records singles